This article lists described species of the family Asilidae start with letter Z.

A
B
C
D
E
F
G
H
I
J
K
L
M
N
O
P
Q
R
S
T
U
V
W
Y
Z

List of Species

Genus Zabrops
 Zabrops janiceae (Fisher, 1977)
 Zabrops thologaster (Fisher, 1977)
 Zabrops wilcoxi (Fisher, 1977)

Genus Zabrotica
 Zabrotica clarkei (Hull, 1958)

Genus Zelamyia
 Zelamyia alyctus (Londt, 2005)

Genus Zosteria
 Zosteria affinis (Daniels, 1987)
 Zosteria alpina (Daniels, 1987)
 Zosteria caesariata (Daniels, 1987)
 Zosteria calignea (Daniels, 1987)
 Zosteria claudiana (Daniels, 1987)
 Zosteria clausum (Daniels, 1987)
 Zosteria clivosa (Daniels, 1987)
 Zosteria eastwoodi (Daniels, 1987)
 Zosteria hispida (Daniels, 1987)
 Zosteria illingworthi (Hardy, 1922)
 Zosteria lineata (Daniels, 1987)
 Zosteria longiceps (Daniels, 1987)
 Zosteria montana (Daniels, 1987)
 Zosteria murina (Macquart, 1838)
 Zosteria nigrifemorata (Daniels, 1987)
 Zosteria novazealandica (Daniels, 1987)
 Zosteria punicea (Daniels, 1987)
 Zosteria queenslandi (Daniels, 1987)
 Zosteria rosevillensis (Hardy, 1935)
 Zosteria rubens (Daniels, 1987)
 Zosteria ruspata (Daniels, 1987)
 Zosteria suda (Daniels, 1987)
 Zosteria varia (Daniels, 1987)
 Zosteria venator (Daniels, 1987)

Genus Zoticus
 Zoticus fitzroyi (Artigas, 1974)
 Zoticus toconaoensis (Artigas, 1970)

References 

 
Asilidae